The Intestine is a 2016 Canadian independent film written and directed by Lev Lewis. It stars Melanie Scheiner as a young woman attempting to better her life by appropriating a rich man's home.

The film premiered at the Vancouver International Film Festival on October 3, 2016 and had its international premiere at the Buenos Aires International Festival of Independent Cinema on April 21, 2017.

Plot 
Penniless and unhappy, Maya is growing increasingly fed up with her tedious job, unexciting friends, rundown apartment and the never-ending burden of caring for her drug-addict mother. Late one night she meets a wealthy man, Philip, and wakes up the next morning alone in his upscale suburban home. With Philip nowhere to be found, she attempts to discard her old life and take possession of his empty house. Maya befriends a neighbour and tries to settle in, when she receives a phone call from the hospital informing her of her mother's overdose death. Unable to fully process the news, she hangs up on the doctor.

Maya's attempt at relocation is hampered by the late-night arrival of Philip's sister, Meagan, who is searching for her vanished brother. Meagan comes to believe that Maya is responsible for his disappearance and chases her out of the house. Unwilling to return to her old life, Maya begins to formulate a plan to take back the property she feels is now rightly hers. Sneaking back into the house, Maya witnesses Meagan in the throes of an extramarital affair. Using a friend's car, Maya tracks Meagan and her lover to a lake-side cottage, where she confronts them and offers to keep their liaison secret in exchange for access to Philip's house. Meagan concedes.

Time passes and Maya makes the house her home. The morning after a small party she has thrown at the house, Maya calls the hospital, hoping for more information on her mother's passing, but the doctor is unable to properly hear or understand Maya's words.

Cast

Production

Kickstarter campaign 
On April 2, 2015 a Kickstarter campaign was launched with a fundraising target of $6,000 under the working title Sublet. On May 1, 2015 funding closed with $6,550 pledged by 72 backers.

Filming 
Principal photography began in Toronto on June 2, 2015.

Music 
The original score was written by the film's director Lev Lewis. The film features the song "Antabus" by the Swedish post-punk band Makthaverskan.

References

External links 
 
 

2016 films
English-language Canadian films
Canadian drama films
Canadian independent films
Films set in Toronto
2010s English-language films
2010s Canadian films